Charles Borromeo (2 October 1538 – 3 November 1584) was the Archbishop of Milan from 1564 to 1584 and a cardinal of the Catholic Church. He was a leading figure of the Counter-Reformation combat against the Protestant Reformation together with Ignatius of Loyola and Philip Neri. In that role he was responsible for significant reforms in the Catholic Church, including the founding of seminaries for the education of priests. He is honoured as a saint by the Catholic Church, with a feast day on 4 November.

Early life
Borromeo was a descendant of nobility; the Borromeo family was one of the most ancient and wealthy in Lombardy, made famous by several notable men, both in the church and state. The family coat of arms included the Borromean rings, which are sometimes taken to symbolize the Holy Trinity. Borromeo's father Gilbert was Count of Arona. His mother Margaret was a member of the Milan branch of the House of Medici. The second son in a family of six children, he was born in the castle of Arona on Lake Maggiore 36 miles from Milan on 2 October 1538.

Borromeo received the tonsure when he was about twelve years old. At this time his paternal uncle Giulio Cesare Borromeo turned over to him the income from the rich Benedictine abbey of Sts. Gratinian and Felin, one of the ancient perquisites of the family. Borromeo made plain to his father that all revenues from the abbey beyond what was required to prepare him for a career in the church belonged to the poor and could not be applied to secular use. The young man attended the University of Pavia, where he applied himself to the study of civil and canon law. Due to a slight speech impediment, he was regarded as slow but his thoroughness and industry meant that he made rapid progress. In 1554 his father died, and although he had an elder brother, Count Federico, he was requested by the family to take the management of their domestic affairs. After a time, he resumed his studies, and on 6 December 1559, he earned a doctorate in canon and civil law.

Rome period
On 25 December 1559 Borromeo's uncle Cardinal Giovanni Angelo Medici was elected as Pope Pius IV. The newly elected pope required his nephew to come to Rome, and on 13 January 1560 appointed him protonotary apostolic. Shortly thereafter, on 31 January 1560, the pope created him cardinal, and thus Borromeo as cardinal-nephew was entrusted with both the public and the privy seal of the ecclesiastical state. He was also brought into the government of the Papal States and appointed a supervisor of the Franciscans, Carmelites and Knights of Malta.

During his four years in Rome, Borromeo lived in austerity, obliged the Roman Curia to wear black, and established an academy of learned persons, the Academy of the Vatican Knights, publishing their memoirs as the Noctes Vaticanae.

Borromeo organized the third and last session of the Council of Trent, in 1562–63. He had a large share in the making of the Tridentine Catechism (Catechismus Romanus). In 1561, Borromeo founded and endowed a college at Pavia, today known as Almo Collegio Borromeo, which he dedicated to Justina of Padua.

On 19 November 1562, his older brother, Federico, suddenly died. His family urged Borromeo to seek permission to return to the lay state (laicization), to marry and have children so that the family name would not become extinct, but he decided not to leave the ecclesiastic state. His brother's death, along with his contacts with the Jesuits and the Theatines and the example of bishops such as Bartholomew of Braga, were the causes of the conversion of Borromeo towards a more strict and operative Christian life, and his aim became to put into practice the dignity and duties of the bishop as drafted by the recent Council of Trent.

Archbishop of Milan
Borromeo was appointed an administrator of the Archdiocese of Milan on 7 February 1560. After his decision to put into practice the role of bishop, he decided to be ordained priest (4 September 1563) and on 7 December 1563 he was consecrated bishop in the Sistine Chapel by Cardinal Giovanni Serbelloni. Borromeo was formally appointed archbishop of Milan on 12 May 1564 after the former archbishop Ippolito II d'Este waived his claims on that archbishopric, but he was only allowed by the pope to leave Rome one year later. Borromeo made his formal entry into Milan as archbishop on 23 September 1565.

Reform in Milan

After the death of his uncle, Pius IV (1566), Borromeo sent a galley to fetch Cardinal Ugo Boncompagni, the Nuncio in Spain, but he did not arrive in time to be considered at the conclave. Borromeo then reached an agreement with Alessandro Farnese, who held a significant number of votes, to support Antonio Ghislieri, who was rumored to have the support of Philip II of Spain. Ghislieri was elected and took the name Pius V.

Before Borromeo went to Milan, while he was overseeing reform in Rome, a nobleman remarked that the latter city was no longer a place to enjoy oneself or to make a fortune. "Carlo Borromeo has undertaken to remake the city from top to bottom," he said, predicting that the reformer's enthusiasm "would lead him to correct the rest of the world once he has finished with Rome."

Subsequently, he devoted himself to the reformation of his diocese which had deteriorated in practice owing to the 80-year absence of previous archbishops. Milan was the largest archdiocese in Italy at the time, with more than 3,000 clergy and 800,000 people. Both its clergy and laity had drifted from church teaching. The selling of indulgences and ecclesiastical positions was prevalent; monasteries were "full of disorder"; many religious were "lazy, ignorant, and debauched". 

Borromeo made numerous pastoral visits and restored dignity to divine service. He urged churches to be designed in conformity with the decrees of the Council of Trent, which stated that sacred art and architecture lacking adequate scriptural foundation was in effect prohibited, as was any inclusion of classical pagan elements in religious art. He divided the nave of the church into two compartments to separate the sexes at worship. He extended his reforms to the collegiate churches, monasteries and even to the Confraternities of Penitents, particularly that of St. John the Baptist. This group was to attend to prisoners and those condemned to death, to give them help and support.

Borromeo believed that abuses in the church arose from ignorant clergy. Among his most important actions, he established seminaries, colleges, and communities for the education of candidates for holy orders. His emphasis on Catholic learning greatly increased the preparation of men for the priesthood and benefited their congregations. In addition, he founded the fraternity of Oblates of St. Ambrose, a society of secular men who did not take orders, but devoted themselves to the church and followed a discipline of monastic prayers and study. They provided assistance to parishes when so directed. The new archbishop's efforts for catechesis and the instruction of youth included the initiation of the first "Sunday School" classes and the work of the Confraternity for Christian Doctrine.

Borromeo's diocesan reforms faced opposition from several religious orders, particularly that of the Humiliati (Brothers of Humility), a penitential order which, although reduced to about 170 members, owned some ninety monasteries. Some members of that society formed a conspiracy against his life, and a shot was fired at him with an arquebus in the archepiscopal chapel. His survival was considered miraculous.

In 1576 there was famine at Milan due to crop failures, and later an outbreak of the plague. The city's trade fell off, and along with it the people's source of income. The Governor and many members of the nobility fled the city, but the bishop remained, to organize the care of those affected and to minister to the dying. He called together the superiors of all the religious communities in the diocese and won their cooperation. Borromeo tried to feed 60,000 to 70,000 people daily. He used up his own funds and went into debt to provide food for the hungry. Finally, he wrote to the Governor and successfully persuaded him to return.

Influence on English affairs

Borromeo had also been involved in English affairs when he assisted Pius IV. Many English Catholics had fled to Italy at this time because of the persecutions under Queen Elizabeth I. He gave pastoral attention to English Catholics who fled to Italy to escape the new laws against the Catholic faith. Edmund Campion, a Jesuit, along with Ralph Sherwin visited him at Milan in 1580 on their way to England.  They stayed with him for eight days, talking with him every night after dinner. A Welshman, Griffith Roberts, served as his canon theologian, and an Englishman, Thomas Goldwell, as vicar-general. The archbishop carried on his person a small picture of John Fisher, who, with Thomas More, had been executed during the reign of Henry VIII, and for whom he held a great veneration.  During the nineteenth-century Catholic restoration in England, Cardinal Wiseman was to institute an order of Oblates of St Charles, led by Henry Edward Manning, as a congregation of secular priests directly supporting the Archbishop of Westminster.

Persecution of religious dissidents

Though the Diet of Ilanz of 1524 and 1526 had proclaimed freedom of worship in the Republic of the Three Leagues, Borromeo repressed Protestantism in the Swiss valleys. The Catholic Encyclopedia relates: "In November [1583] he began a visitation as Apostolic visitor of all the cantons of Switzerland and the Grisons, leaving the affairs of his diocese in the hands of Monsignor Owen Lewis, his vicar-general. He began in the Mesoleina Valley; here not only was their heresy to be fought, but also witchcraft and sorcery, and at Roveredo it was discovered that "the provost or rector, was the foremost in sorceries." During his pastoral visit to the region, 150 people were arrested for practicing witchcraft. Eleven women and the provost were condemned by the civil authorities to be burned alive.

Reacting to the pressure of the Protestant Reformation, Borromeo encouraged Ludwig Pfyffer in his development of the "Golden League", but did not live to see its formation in 1586.  Based in Lucerne, the organization (also called the Borromean League) linked activities of several Swiss Catholic cantons of Switzerland, which became the centre of Catholic Counter-Reformation efforts.  This organization was determined to expel heretics. It created severe strains in the civil administration of the confederation, and caused the break-up of Appenzell canton along religious lines.

Controversy and last days

Charged with implementing the reforms dictated by the Council of Trent, Borromeo's uncompromising stance brought him into conflict with secular leaders, priests, and even the Pope. He met with much opposition to his reforms. The governor of the province and many of the senators addressed complaints to the courts of Rome and Madrid.

In 1584, during his annual retreat at Monte Varallo, he fell ill with "intermittent fever and ague", and on returning to Milan grew rapidly worse. After receiving the Last Rites, he quietly died on 3 November at the age of 46.

Veneration
Following his death, popular devotion to Borromeo arose quickly and continued to grow. The Milanese celebrated his anniversary as though he were already a saint, and supporters in a number of cities collected documentation to support his canonization.  In 1602 Clement VIII beatified Borromeo. In 1604 his case was sent to the Congregation of Rites. On 1 November 1610, Pope Paul V canonized Borromeo. Three years later, the church added his feast to the General Roman Calendar for celebration on 4 November. Along with Guarinus of Palestrina and perhaps Anselm of Lucca, he is one of only two or three cardinal-nephews to have been canonized.

Charles Borromeo is the patron saint of bishops, catechists and seminarians.

Iconography
Borromeo's emblem is the Latin word humilitas (humility), which is a portion of the Borromeo shield. He is usually represented in art in his robes, barefoot, carrying the cross as archbishop, a rope around his neck, one hand raised in blessing, thus recalling his work during the plague.

Sources
Borromeo' biography was originally written by three of his contemporaries: Agostino Valerio (afterwards cardinal and Bishop of Verona) and Carlo Bascape (General of the Barnabites, afterwards Bishop of Novara), who wrote their contributions in Latin, and Pietro Giussanno (a priest), who wrote his in Italian. Giussanno's account was the most detailed of the three.

Legacy

Borromeo's correspondence shows his influential position in Europe during his lifetime. The popes under whom he served sought his advice. The Catholic sovereigns of Europe – Henry III of France, Philip II of Spain, Mary, Queen of Scots – and others showed how they valued his influence. Cardinal Valerio of Verona said of him that Borromeo was "to the well-born a pattern of virtue, to his brother cardinals an example of true nobility." Cardinal Baronius styled him "a second Ambrose, whose early death, lamented by all good men, inflicted great loss on the Church."

Late in the sixteenth or at the beginning of the seventeenth century, Catholics in England  circulated among themselves a "Life of St. Charles".

Monuments
 Contrary to Borromeo's last wishes, the Duomo di Milano created a memorial crypt to honour him at the church.
 His relative Federico Borromeo and admirers commissioned a statue 20 m high that was erected on the hill above Arona, as they regarded him an important leader of the Counter-Reformation.

Writings
 Besides the Noctes Vaticanae, to which he appeared to have contributed, Borromeo's written legacy consisted only of some homilies, discourses and sermons, with a collection of letters.  Borromeo's sermons have been translated into many languages.

Churches
A large number of churches dedicated to St. Charles Borromeo exist, including:

Europe 
 Karlskirche, Vienna, Austria
 St Charles Borromeo Church, Sheffield
 St Charles Borromeo Church, Kingston upon Hull, England
 St. Charles Borromeo RC Church, Hampton Magna, England
 St. Charles Borromeo RC Church, Aigburth, Liverpool, England
 Our Lady and St Charles Borromeo Catholic Church, Wisbech, England
 St. Charles Borromeo Roman Catholic Oratory, North Kelvinside, Glasgow, Scotland 
 St. Charles Borromeo Church, Antwerp, Belgium
 San Carlo alle Quattro Fontane, Rome, Italy
 St. Charles Borromeo Roman Catholic Church, Pancevo, Vojvodina, Serbia
 Church of St. Charles Borromeo (Warsaw, Poland)
 St. Charles Borromeo Cemetery Church, Vienna

North America 
St. Charles Borromeo Catholic Church, Peru, Indiana
 Saint Charles Borromeo Catholic Church, Grand Coteau, Louisiana
 Saint Charles Borromeo Catholic Church, Toronto, Ontario, Canada
 Saint Charles Borromeo Catholic Church, North Hollywood, California 
 St Charles Borromeo Catholic Church, Visalia, California 
 Cathedral of San Carlos Borromeo, California
 Mission San Carlos Borromeo de Carmelo, California
 St. Charles Borromeo Catholic Church and Academy (Pt. Loma, California)
 St. Charles Borromeo Roman Catholic Church, Port Charlotte, Florida
 St. Charles Borromeo Roman Catholic Church in Hampshire, Illinois
 St. Charles Borromeo Church (Destrehan, Louisiana)
 St. Charles Borromeo Church, Brooklyn New York
 St. Charles Borromeo Church (New York City), New York
 St. Charles's Church (Staten Island, New York)
 St. Charles Borromeo Catholic Church (Nederland, Texas)
 St. Charles Borromeo Catholic Church in St. Charles, Missouri
 St. Charles Borromeo Catholic Church in Minneapolis, Minnesota
 St. Charles Borromeo Catholic Church (Oakes, North Dakota)
 St. Charles Borromeo Catholic Church (Kettering, Ohio)
 St. Charles Borromeo (Lima, Ohio)
 St. Charles Borromeo Church (Parma, Ohio)
 St. Charles Borromeo (South Charleston, Ohio)
 St. Charles Borromeo  in Pikesville, Maryland
 St. Charles Borromeo Catholic Church (Woburn, Massachusetts)  
 St. Charles Borromeo Catholic Church (Gretna, Nebraska)
 St. Charles Borromeo Catholic Church (Skillman, New Jersey)
 St. Charles Borromeo Roman Catholic Church in Greece, New York
 St. Charles Borromeo Catholic Church (Syracuse, New York)
 St. Charles Borromeo Catholic Church (Ahoskie, North Carolina)
 St. Charles Borromeo Catholic Church (Drexel Hill, Pennsylvania)
 St Charles Borromeo Roman Catholic Church (Fermeuse, Newfoundland and Labrador)
 St. Charles Borromeo Roman Catholic Church, est. 1846, Woonsocket, Rhode Island
 St. Charles Borromeo Catholic Church (Milan, Indiana), in Ripley County
 St. Charles Church (Arlington, Virginia)
 St. Charles Parish, Spokane, Washington  
 St. Charles Borromeo Catholic Church (Oklahoma City, OK) 
 St. Charles Borromeo Catholic Church (Du Bois, Illinois)
 
 St. Charles Borromeo Catholic Church (Meredith, NH)

South America 
 Cathedral of San Carlos de Bariloche, Argentina
 St. Charles Borromeo Cathedral, São Carlos, Brazil
 Cathedral of San Carlos Borromeo (Chillán), Chile
 Cathedral Basilica of San Carlos Borromeo (Puno), Peru
 San Carlos Borromeo, San Carlos, Uruguay
 Cathedral of San Carlos (Cojedes), Venezuela

Seminaries
 St Charles Borromeo Seminary of the Archdiocese of Košice, in Košice, Slovakia
 St. Charles Borromeo Seminary of the Archdiocese of Philadelphia, Pennsylvania, United States
 San Carlos Seminary of the Archdiocese of Manila in Makati, Philippines
 Colegio San Carlos, a recognized primary and secondary school in Bogotá, Colombia, and home for a Benedictine community of priests
 Saint Charles Borromeo Major Seminary of Nyakibanda in Rwanda
 St Charles' Seminary in Perth, Australia
 Borromeo Seminary in Wickliffe, Ohio
 St. Charles Seminary in Carthagena, Ohio, now a retirement home
 St. Charles Seminary (Staten Island, New York), closed and slated for private homes
St. Charles Seminary (SVD), Goden Rock, Trichy, Tamil Nadu, India
St Charles Borromeo Minor Seminary Senior High School, Tamale, Ghana

Other
 His nephew, Federico Borromeo (1564–1631), was archbishop of Milan from 1595 and founded the Ambrosian Library in that city.  He donated his collection of art and literature to the library. He appeared as a character in Alessandro Manzoni's novel The Betrothed (I promessi sposi).
 Sint. Carolus hospital, first Catholic hospital in Indonesia founded by Perkumpulan Perhimpunan St. Carolus Vereeniging (PPSC). It is managed by Kongregasi Suster-Suster Cinta Kasih St. Carolus Borromeus (Sisters of Mercy of St. Borromeo ) since its foundation in 1913.
 Borromeo was crucial in furthering the career of composer Orfeo Vecchi.
 Borromeo is one of four people mentioned at the beginning of the Catechism of the Catholic Church, as responsible for the Council of Trent, which gave way to the modern-day catechism. The others are Peter Canisius, Turibius of Mongrovejo and Robert Bellarmine.
 Saint Charles Preparatory School, a former college seminary now a four-year Catholic college preparatory school in Columbus, Ohio
 Lewis University, a Catholic and Lasallian University, St. Charles Borromeo North Campus
 St. Charles, Missouri
 St. Charles, Illinois
 St. Charles, Minnesota 
 São Carlos, Brazil
 Saint-Charles-Borromée, Quebec, Canada 
 San Carlos City, Pangasinan, Philippines
 The San Carlos de Borromeo Fortress on Margarita Island, state of Nueva Esparta, Venezuela, completed in 1684, intended to help protect settlements in the Bay of Pampatar area against the constant threat of piracy
 University of San Carlos in Cebu City, Philippines
 Universidad de San Carlos de Guatemala in Guatemala, originally named "Royal and Pontifical University of San Carlos Borromeo"

Music

 Marc-Antoine Charpentier has composed a dramatic motet, Pestis Mediolanensis H.398 & H.398 a, for soloists, double chorus, two flutes, double string orchestra, and continuo (1670?)

See also
 Guastallines
 Saint Charles Borromeo, patron saint archive
 
 Silent preaching
 Sancarlone
 Oblates of Saints Ambrose and Charles

References

Sources 
 
 
 A Sala, Documenti circa la vita e la gesta di Borromeo (4 vols., Milan: 1857–1859)
 Chanoine Silvain, Histoire de St Charles Borromeo (Milan: 1884)
 A Cantono, "Un grande riformatore del secolo XVI" (Florence: 1904); "Borromus" in Herzog-Hauck, Realencyklopädie (Leipzig: 1897).

External links

 Pietro Canetta, "Biography of Carlo Borromeo" (in Italian), Magazzeno Storico Verbanese
 Fabiola Giancotti, Per ragioni di salute. San Carlo Borromeo nel quarto centenario della canonizzazione 1610-2010,  (Il Club di Milano, Spirali 2010)
Colonnade Statue in St Peter's Square
 Saint Charles Borromeo, Aphorisms 1561-1584, (Il Club di Milano, 2012)
 
 Epistolario di San Carlo: Digital edition of the manuscript and letters of Carlo Borromeo
 Website of St Charles Church,Volders in Tirol

 Birgit Heß-Kickert: Architekturtheorie der italienischen Renaissance. Die Instructiones fabricae et supellectilis ecclesiasticae des Carlo Borromeo. Saarbrücken, 1999

1538 births
1584 deaths
People from Arona, Piedmont
Carlo
16th-century Italian cardinals
Archbishops of Milan
16th-century Italian Roman Catholic archbishops
Participants in the Council of Trent
São Carlos
Cardinal-nephews
Burials at Milan Cathedral
Cardinal Secretaries of State
Members of the Sacred Congregation of the Council
Major Penitentiaries of the Apostolic Penitentiary
Incorrupt saints
University of Pavia alumni
 
Witch hunters
Witch trials in Italy